The Tetcho Formation is a stratigraphical unit of Famennian age in the Western Canadian Sedimentary Basin. 

It takes the name from Tetcho Lake, and was first described in the Imperial Island River No. 1 well (located south of Trout Lake by H.R. Belyea and D.J. McLaren in 1962.

Lithology
The Tetcho Formation is composed of fine grained limestone with shale partings, silty at the base.

Distribution

Relationship to other units

The Tetcho Formation is conformably overlain by the Kotcho Formation and conformably overlays the Trout River Formation and Fort Simpson Formation.

It is equivalent to the lower Wabamun Group in Alberta and to parts of the Besa River Formation in the Liard area of British Columbia.

References

Stratigraphy of British Columbia
Stratigraphy of the Northwest Territories